The Kentucky State Police (KSP) is a department of the Kentucky Justice and Public Safety Cabinet, and the official State Police force of the  Commonwealth of Kentucky, responsible for statewide law enforcement. The department was founded in 1948 and replaced the Kentucky Highway Patrol. The department's sworn personnel hold the title State Trooper and are addressed as Trooper (with the exception of sworn Commercial Vehicle Enforcement and Facilities Security Branch personnel, both of which hold the title and are addressed as Officer)  and its nickname is The Thin Gray Line.

History
In 1948, the Kentucky General Assembly enacted the State Police Act, creating the Kentucky State Police and making Kentucky the 38th state to create a force whose jurisdiction extends throughout the given state. The act was signed July 1 of that year by Governor Earle C. Clements. The force was modeled after the  Pennsylvania State Police. The force was the successor agency to the Kentucky Highway Patrol, and inherited the equipment and officers from that organization. KSP is the premier law enforcement agency of Kentucky, having full jurisdiction in all 120 counties and all 33 independent cities. Guthrie F. Crowe served as the force's first commissioner.

Until 2013, KSP training materials instructed officers to "meet violence with greater violence" and to be "ruthless killer[s]", and featured a quotation from Adolf Hitler.

Posts
Kentucky State Police troopers operate from 16 regional posts: West Troop contains Posts 1, 2, 3, 4, 5, 12, 15 and 16. East Troop contains Posts 6, 7, 8, 9, 10, 11, 13 and 14. there is also Regional Offices of the KSP Division of Commercial Vehicle Enforcement. West Troop contains Regions 1, 2 and 3. East Troop contains Regions 4, 5 and 6. The Special Enforcement Troop contains Cannabis Suppression, West Drug Enforcement, East Drug Enforcement, Aircraft Support, Vehicle Investigations, Special Operations and the Critical Incident Response Team.

West Troop
Post 1: Mayfield
Post 2: Madisonville
Post 3: Bowling Green
Post 4: Elizabethtown
Post 5: Campbellsburg
Post 12: Frankfort
Post 15: Columbia
Post 16: Henderson

East Troop
Post 6: Dry Ridge
Post 7: Richmond
Post 8: Morehead
Post 9: Pikeville
Post 10: Harlan
Post 11: London
Post 13: Hazard
Post 14: Ashland

The KSP Division of Commercial Vehicle Enforcement operates from six regional offices:

West Troop
Region 1 Henderson
Region 2 Louisville
Region 3 Georgetown

East Troop
Region 4 London
Region 5 Morehead
Region 6 Pikeville

In addition, the Special Enforcement Troop includes the following branches:
Cannabis Suppression
West Drug Enforcement
East Drug Enforcement
Aircraft Support
Vehicle Investigations
Special Operations
Critical Incident Response Team (CIRT)

Organization

Uniforms of the KSP

Troopers wear the standard French gray KSP uniform, consisting of a short sleeve and long sleeve version. Winter trousers are charcoal gray with a 1" black stripe down the side. Summer trousers are French gray with 1" black stripe. Patent leather chukka high top shoes are worn with both uniforms. The badge is worn on the left side of the shirt, with the trooper's name plate directly below on the left breast pocket flap. Officers wear their rank insignia on the shirt collar while all other troopers wear their rank, if applicable, on their shirt sleeves. A white crew neck T-shirt is worn under the uniform shirt. KSP requires a tie with long sleeve it is tucked into the uniform shirt. The campaign hat is French gray in color, and troopers are issued two hats: straw for summer and felt for winter. A Kentucky State Police full color brass seal is worn on the front of the hat. The hat cord is light gray. Commercial Vehicle Enforcement officers uniforms are identical to that of troopers except that the uniform and campaign hats are tan instead of French gray. Facilities Security Branch uniforms are tan shirts and black pants with a dark straw campaign hat and have a special Facilities Security Branch shoulder patch instead of the standard KSP shoulder patch.

Vehicles
The Kentucky State Police use a variety of police cruisers and patrol vehicles. The current fleet consists of:
Dodge Charger 5.7L AWD PPV
Ford Super Duty Crime Scene Response vehicle (one unit per post)
Ford Explorer Utility Police Interceptors (Commercial Vehicle Enforcement & Post Supervisor)
Ford Taurus Police Interceptors (Facilities Security)
Chevrolet Tahoe PPV

The Dodge Charger 5.7L AWD PPV currently serves as the primary KSP fleet vehicle. Due to Ford's discontinuation of the CVPI in 2011 KSP tested a series of vehicles to replace the CVPI between 2012 and 2013.  These tests included the Chevy Caprice PPV, Ford Taurus, and Dodge Charger PPV.  The KSP Division of Commercial Vehicle Enforcement currently utilize the Ford Explorer Utility Police Interceptor as they retire their fleet of CVPI's and Chevrolet Caprice PPV's. The KSP Facilities Security Branch will replace their CVPI's with Ford Taurus-based Police Interceptors.

Sidearm
In 2017 troopers transitioned from the Glock Model 35 .40 S&W to the Glock Model 17 9mm as their primary sidearm.  Troopers also carry a Glock 43x 9mm as their backup sidearm. The Walther PPK/S as a backup sidearm as well. Prior to 2017 troopers carried a traditional 12 gauge shotgun as their long-range alternative to their sidearm and transitioned to a M&P15 patrol rifle (.223). Prior to the Glock Model 35 troopers carried the 10mm Smith & Wesson (Model 1076 was used).

Overview
The department's headquarters are located at 919 Versailles Road in Frankfort while its training academy is located in the former Frankfort Career Development Center at 380 Coffee Tree Road in Frankfort. Cadets training to become troopers undergo a 24-week, paramilitary-style training program. Potential cadets who hold their Kentucky Peace Officers Professional Standards (POPS) certification and have two years of experience as a local, county or state (including Commercial Vehicle Enforcement officers, Kentucky State Park Rangers and Conservation Officers with the Kentucky Department of Fish & Wildlife Resources) law enforcement officer in Kentucky are eligible to apply to become troopers through the department's Law Enforcement Accelerated Program (LEAP). Those accepted as LEAP cadets must meet all of the other requirements for acceptance into the KSP Academy and undergo an accelerated  13-week academy training class. Sworn Commercial Vehicle Enforcement officers undergo an initial 18 weeks of basic law enforcement officer training at the Department of Criminal Justice Training Academy on the campus of  Eastern Kentucky University in Richmond unless they have already completed this training at an earlier date. This is followed by a four-week training program at the KSP Academy that provides specialized training on commercial vehicle compliance and highway safety. After graduation, probationary troopers & CVE officers must complete field training under the supervision of a training trooper/officer at their assigned post (troopers) or region (CVE officers). Officers with the KSP Facilities Security Branch must meet the requirements for and receive a Special Law Enforcement Officer (SLEO) commission under KRS 61.900-930 as well as undergo specialized training, including firearms training. KSP telecommunicators must complete a six-week training program at the KSP Academy.

The KSP operates the state's system of regional crime labs. In addition, the KSP Facilities Security Branch, along with specially assigned state troopers, is responsible for protecting the Governor, Lieutenant Governor, members of the Kentucky General Assembly and state property, including the Kentucky State Capitol Complex.

On July 14, 2008, the Kentucky Vehicle Enforcement department, which is responsible for commercial vehicle enforcement, became an operational division of the KSP.
 
The department also operates Trooper Island Camp, a juvenile crime prevention program at Dale Hollow Lake State Park.

On February 15, 2017, then-Commissioner Rick Sanders announced the formation of the Critical Incident Response Team (CIRT).  Experienced KSP detectives from throughout the Commonwealth were chosen to investigate Officer Involved Shootings (OIS) as well as Critical Incidents that involved Police or Corrections agencies.

Rank structure

Structure
Commissioner of the State Police
Executive Security Branch
Legal Office
Administration Division
Programs
Drivers Testing Branch
Facilities Security Branch
Financial and Grant Management Branch
Highway Safety Branch
Inspections and Evaluation Section
Legislative Security Branch
Media Relations Branch
Strategic Planning Branch
Internal Operations
Academy Branch
Human Resources Branch
Internal Affairs Branch
Properties Management and Supply Branch
Recruitment Branch
Commercial Vehicle Enforcement Division
West Troop
Region 1
Region 2
Region 3
East Troop
Region 4
Region 5
Region 6
Operations Division
West Troop
Post 1
Post 2
Post 3
Post 4
Post 5
Post 12
Post 15
Post 16
East Troop
Post 6
Post 7
Post 8
Post 9
Post 10
Post 11
Post 13
Post 14
Special Enforcement Troop
Cannabis Suppression
West Drug Enforcement
East Drug Enforcement
Aircraft Support
Vehicle Investigations
Special Operations
Critical Incident Response Team (CIRT)
Technical Services Division
Forensic Division
Central Laboratory – (Frankfort)
Eastern Laboratory – (Ashland)
Jefferson Laboratory – (Louisville)
Northern Laboratory – (Cold Spring)
Southeast Laboratory – (London)
Western Laboratory – (Madisonville)
Office of the Chief Information Officer
Communications and Computer Technologies Branch
Criminal Identification and Records Branch
Headquarters Communications Branch
Intelligence Branch

Demographics

2006
Male: 69%
Female: 31%
White: 92%
African-American/Black: 4%
Asian: 4%

See also

 List of law enforcement agencies in Kentucky
 State police
 Highway patrol
 Kentucky
 Kentucky Marijuana Strike Force

References

External links
Official Website for the Kentucky State Police

Government agencies established in 1948
State law enforcement agencies of Kentucky
1948 establishments in Kentucky